Edmond Kelly, also known as "Ed" or "Eddie" and nicknamed the Silver Fox (born October 24, 1948 in Dublin, Ireland), is an Irish-American former soccer player.  He played in the American Soccer League and one season in the North American Soccer League and earned two caps with the U.S. national team. He coached the Boston College men’s soccer team.

Personal
Kelly grew up in Ireland.  In 1969, he joined the United States Air Force, serving until 1973.  He is married to high school sweetheart, Ann and they have three children: Jessica, Lauren, and Luke. He loves Indian food.

Player

Professional
Kelly played professionally for eight years.  In 1975, he played a single season with the Hartford Bicentennials in the North American Soccer League.  In 1976, he played for the Utah Golden Spikers of the American Soccer League.  In 1979, he signed with the New Jersey Americans.

National team
Kelly earned two caps with the United States men's national soccer team in August 1975 at the Mexico City Cup.  His first game was a 6–0 loss to Argentina on August 21.  His second was a 2–0 loss to Mexico on August 24.

Coaching
Kelly served as an assistant coach with both the Rhode Island Oceaneers and New Jersey Americans while he played for them.  After retiring from playing professionally, Kelly became an assistant coach at Fairleigh Dickinson University.  In 1985, Seton Hall hired Kelly as its men’s soccer coach.  In his three years at Seton Hall, his team compiled a 40–13–3 record and Coach Kelly was named the 1986 NJSCA Division I Coach of the Year.  In 1987, Kelly left Seton Hall to become head coach of the New Jersey Eagles of the newly established American Soccer League.  Kelly led the Eagles to a 15–5 record, top in the league.  However, the team fell to the Washington Diplomats in the first round of the playoffs.  In 1988, following the loss, Kelly left the Eagles to succeed Ben Brewster as head coach at Boston College, where he remains today. Kelly is 183–149–35 during his tenure at the Heights. His 183 wins at Boston College rank him first on BC's all-time list. Kelly has a USSF National "A" Coaching License. He has compiled a  career record of 223–162–41.

Kelly also coaches youth soccer as the Boys Coordinator of New England Futbol Club.

References

External links
 Boston College coaching profile
 NASL Stats

1948 births
Living people
Association footballers from Dublin (city)
American soccer coaches
American Soccer League (1988–89) coaches
American Soccer League (1933–1983) players
Boston College Eagles men's soccer coaches
Connecticut Bicentennials players
Irish emigrants to the United States
New Jersey Americans (ASL) players
North American Soccer League (1968–1984) players
Rhode Island Oceaneers players
Seton Hall Pirates men's soccer coaches
United States men's international soccer players
Utah Golden Spikers players
American soccer players
Association football midfielders
Fairleigh Dickinson Knights men's soccer coaches